Florentina Villalobos Chaparro (27 April 1931 – 10 August 2022) was a Mexican politician. A member of the National Action Party, she served in the Chamber of Deputies from 1964 to 1967 and again from 1982 to 1985.

Villalobos died in Chihuahua City on 10 August 2022, at the age of 91.

References

1931 births
2022 deaths
Deputies of the LII Legislature of Mexico
People from Parral, Chihuahua